Alexander Peya and Bruno Soares were the defending champions, but lost in the semifinals to Pierre-Hugues Herbert and Nicolas Mahut.
Herbert and Mahut went on to win the title, defeating Marcin Matkowski and Nenad Zimonjić in the final, 6–2, 6–2.

Seeds

Draw

Draw

Qualifying

Seeds

Qualifiers
  Chris Guccione /  André Sá

Qualifying draw

External links
 Main draw

Aegon Championships - Doubles
2015 Aegon Championships